ADAC Motorwelt (German: ADAC Motoring) is a German automobile and travel magazine published in Munich, Germany. It is a membership magazine of ADAC (Allgemeiner Deutscher Automobil-Club e.V.) and is one of the largest magazines in the country.

History and profile
ADAC Motorwelt was established in 1925 as a monthly magazine of ADAC. The magazine and ADAC Sport are the successors of another car magazine, Der Motorfahrer, which was published for 22 years until 1925. ADAC Motorwelt is the official media outlet of ADAC. Its publisher is ADAC Verlag. The magazine was published on a monthly basis and has its headquarters in Munich.

It covers articles mainly on cars and travel-related topics. In regard to the cars, the magazine features news about road tests, motor sports and new model previews. It publishes several lists and provides awards, including "Germany’s favourite car", based on reader votes. In January 2014 Michael Ramstetter, editor of the magazine, resigned from the post due to alleged vote manipulation in relation to the award of "Germany’s favourite car" for 2013.

From 2020 ADAC Motorwelt became a quarterly publication. In the first quarter of 2020, the Burda affiliate BCN started to handle everything from production and printing to editorial services to marketing to distribution of the ADAC Motorwelt; the mobility club continues to be its publisher, and editor-in-chief Martin Kunz continues to oversee the content. At the same time, ADAC enhances and expands its digital communication channels.

ADAC Motorwelt is available at the ADAC local offices, travel agencies and driver safety locations as well as the EDEKA and Netto supermarkets. All members need to do to get a copy of the magazine is show their membership card.

Circulation
In 1992 ADAC Motorwelt had a circulation of 10.9 million copies. It was the top special interest magazine worldwide in 2001 with a circulation of 13,162,000 copies. The magazine had an average circulation of 13,777,000 copies in 2003, making it the largest magazine in Germany. It was again the largest magazine in the country with a circulation of 13,616,000 copies in 2005. During the fourth quarter of 2006 its circulation was 13,849,000 copies. Its total circulation was 13,700,000 copies in 2006, making it the largest magazine in Germany.

The circulation of ADAC Motorwelt was 13,808,111 copies in 2010, making it the largest European automobile magazine.

See also
 List of magazines in Germany

References

External links

1925 establishments in Germany
Automobile magazines published in Germany
German-language magazines
Magazines established in 1925
Magazines published in Munich
Monthly magazines published in Germany
Quarterly magazines published in Germany